Latigo leather is cowhide leather that is combination tanned. First it is chrome tanned, then it is vegetable tanned. Before modern combination tanning, latigo had been combination tanned with alum and gambier.

Latigo is usually infused with oils and waxes. Techniques such as hot-stuffing, wet-stuffing, and fat liquoring have been devised to increase the amount of oil and wax the hide can hold. Due to oil/wax infusion, and its partial chrome tanning, the leather is moderately flexible, less rigid than full vegetable tans, but more rigid than full chrome tans.  Because of its weight and tanning process, latigo is among the most expensive cattle hide leathers.

In Western saddlery latigos are the name given to straps securing the cinches to the saddle rigging. They are named for the latigo leather used to create them. They are traditionally burgundy in color. 

Latigo is frequently manufactured in weights of 8-12oz, appropriate for use in belts and straps for bags and cases. Lighter latigos in the 3-7oz range are also manufactured, although in smaller quantities. Much Latigo is manufactured in black, or various hues of brown and red. However, latigos in brighter colors are also available, white included.  Bright colors are achieved by bleaching the hide prior to dyeing, and by applying pigment to the surface of the hide.

References

Western-style riding
Horse harness